Wyoming Highway 241 (WYO 241) is a  state road in Lincoln County, Wyoming that parallels U.S. Route 89 (US 89) for a short distance just south of Afton.

Route description
Wyoming Highway 241 begins its southern end at US Route 89 in Smoot and from there parallels US 89 which lies east of Highway 241. WYO 241 heads north 4.27 miles and ends at Wyoming Highway 236 near its east end with US 89; located just south of Afton.

Major intersections

References

Official 2003 State Highway Map of Wyoming

External links 

Wyoming State Routes

Transportation in Lincoln County, Wyoming
241